The following is a list of the 423 communes of the Yonne department of France.

The communes cooperate in the following intercommunalities (as of 2020):
Communauté d'agglomération de l'Auxerrois
Communauté d'agglomération du Grand Sénonais
Communauté de communes de l'Agglomération Migennoise
Communauté de communes de l'Aillantais
Communauté de communes Avallon - Vézelay - Morvan
Communauté de communes Chablis Villages et Terroirs
Communauté de communes de la Cléry, du Betz et de l'Ouanne (partly)
Communauté de communes du Gâtinais en Bourgogne
Communauté de communes Haut Nivernais-Val d'Yonne (partly)
Communauté de communes du Jovinien
Communauté de communes de Puisaye-Forterre (partly)
Communauté de communes du Serein
Communauté de communes Serein et Armance
Communauté de communes Le Tonnerrois en Bourgogne
Communauté de communes de la Vanne et du Pays d'Othe
Communauté de communes Yonne Nord

References

Yonne